Sports is the 10th comedy album released by Bill Cosby in October 1969. It was his first on the Uni Records label, which would eventually become MCA Records.  It won the Grammy Award for Best Comedy Album at the 1970 Grammy Awards. It was recorded live at Whisky a Go Go.

Track listing
Football - 7:01
Bill Cosby Goes to a Football Game - 6:24
Baseball - 4:57
Track and Field: High Jump - 10:52
Track and Field: Mile Relay - 8:32
Basketball - 3:37

References

Bill Cosby live albums
Stand-up comedy albums
Spoken word albums by American artists
Live spoken word albums
1969 live albums
Uni Records live albums
Albums recorded at the Whisky a Go Go
Grammy Award for Best Comedy Album
1960s comedy albums
1960s spoken word albums